A sidewalk is a paved pedestrian way found chiefly in cities.

Sidewalk may also refer to:

Music
 Sidewalk (album), 1984, by Australian band Icehouse, or the song of the same name 
 Sidewalks (album), 2010, by Matt & Kim
 "Sidewalks" (song), by The Weeknd
 "Sidewalk", a song by Built to Spill from their 1999 album Keep It Like a Secret
 "Sidewalk", a song by Avail from their 1994 album Dixie
"Sidewalks", a 2004 single by Story of the Year
 Sidewalk Records, a 1960s music label

Television
Sidewalks Entertainment, an American talk show / variety television series
Sidewalks: Video Nite, an American music video television series

Other uses
 Amazon Sidewalk, a long-range wireless networking protocol
 Sidewalk Labs, Alphabet Inc.'s urban innovation organization
 Sidewalk (magazine), a British skateboarding magazine
 Sidewalk, a gay bar and restaurant in the Birmingham Gay Village
 Sidewalk.com, a former Microsoft-owned website
Sidewalk, a non-fiction book about street vendors by Mitchell Duneier
 Sidewalk Moving Picture Festival, a film festival in Birmingham, Alabama

See also
 Moving sidewalk, a slow conveyor belt that transports people horizontally or on an incline
 Moving Sidewalks, a 1960s psychedelic blues-rock band